Veronika Sergeyevna Stepanova (born 4 January 2001) is a Russian cross-country skier who competes internationally with the Russian national team.

Career
Stepanova competed at three Junior World Championships from 2019 to 2021, winning individual gold in the 5 km freestyle technique in 2021, and two silver medals with the relay team in 2019 and 2021. She represented Russian Olympic Committee athletes at the 2022 Winter Olympics in the individual sprint and won a gold medal in the women's 4 × 5 kilometre relay.

Personal life
During the meeting with Russian president Vladimir Putin on 26 April 2022, commemorating Russian medal winners at the 2022 Winter Olympics and in the wake of the Russian invasion of Ukraine, Stepanova said: "In my eyes, Russia is back strong, proud and successful again. Not everyone in the world likes her; it’s obvious. But we are on the right track, and we will definitely win, just as we won the Olympics."

Cross-country skiing results
All results are sourced from the International Ski Federation (FIS).

Olympic Games
1 medal – (1 gold)

World Cup

Season standings

Team podiums
 1 victory – (1 , 1 ) 
 1 podium – (1 )

Notes

References

External links

2001 births
Living people
Russian female cross-country skiers
FIS Nordic World Ski Championships medalists in cross-country skiing
Cross-country skiers at the 2022 Winter Olympics
Medalists at the 2022 Winter Olympics
Olympic cross-country skiers of Russia
Olympic medalists in cross-country skiing
Olympic gold medalists for the Russian Olympic Committee athletes
People from Yelizovo
Sports controversies